Karasuk may refer to:
Karasuk culture, a group of Bronze Age societies
Karasuk languages, a hypothetical language family linking the Yeniseian languages and Burushaski
Karasuk Urban Settlement, a municipal formation which the Town of Karasuk in Karasuksky District of Novosibirsk Oblast, Russia is incorporated as
Karasuk (inhabited locality), several inhabited localities in Russia
Karasuk (river), a river in Novosibirsk Oblast, Russia